Hadakan (also Romanized as Hadakān and Hadkān; also known as Hada Ku and Hadakuh) is a village in Bu ol Kheyr Rural District, Delvar District, Tangestan County, Bushehr Province, Iran. At the 2006 census, its population was 136, in 29 families.

References 

Populated places in Tangestan County